Raúl Monier (born 7 May 1960), is an Argentine chess FIDE Master (FM) (1985).

Biography
From the end of 1970s to the begin to 1980s Raúl Monier was one of Argentina's leading chess players. In 1983, he participated in the Argentine Chess Championship final and shared 3rd-5th place. Raúl Monier twice participated in American Continental Chess Championships (2003, 2005).

Raúl Monier played for Argentina and Argentina B team in the Chess Olympiads:
 In 1978, at second reserve board in the 23rd Chess Olympiad in Buenos Aires (+4, =5, -1),
 In 1984, at second reserve board in the 26th Chess Olympiad in Thessaloniki (+3, =7, -1).

Raúl Monier played for Argentina in the World Youth U26 Team Chess Championship:
 In 1981, at fourth board in the 3rd World Youth U26 Team Chess Championship in Graz (+4, =3, -2).

References

External links

Raúl Monier chess games at 365chess.com

1960 births
Living people
Argentine chess players
Chess FIDE Masters
Chess Olympiad competitors
20th-century chess players